

Visigothic queens in Toulouse

Countess consort of Toulouse

Early Frankish countesses

Senior House of Rouergue, 844–1105 
{| width=95% class="wikitable"
!width = "8%" | Picture
!width = "10%" | Name 
!width = "9%" | Father
!width = "10%" | Birth
!width = "9%" | Marriage
!width = "9%" | Became Countess
!width = "9%" | Ceased to be Countess
!width = "9%" | Death
!width = "6%" | Spouse
|-
|align="center"|  
|align="center"| Oda
|align="center"| -
|align="center"| -
|align="center"| -
|align="center"| 844husband's accession
|align="center"| 852husband's death
|align="center"| -
|align="center"| Fredelon
|-
|align="center"|  
|align="center"| Bertheis
|align="center"| Remigius
|align="center"| -
|align="center"| -
|align="center"| 852husband's accession
|align="center"| 863husband's desposition
|align="center"| after 6 April 883
|align="center"| Raymond I
|-
|align="center"|  
|align="center"| Ermengarda
|align="center"| -
|align="center"| -
|align="center"| -
|align="center"| 863–865husband's appointment in opposition to Humfrid
|align="center"| 863–865?|align="center"| after 21 July 883
|align="center"| Sunyer
|-
|align="center"|  
|align="center"| Ermengarde of Auvergne
|align="center"| Bernard I of AuvergneorGuerin I of Auvergne
|align="center"| -
|align="center"| -
|align="center"| 877husband's accession|align="center"| 20 June 885or16 August 886husband's death|align="center"| after 21 July 883
|align="center"| Bernard III Plantapilosa
|-
|align="center"|  
|align="center"| Garsenda, Countess of Albi
|align="center"| Ermengol, Count of Albi
|align="center"| -
|align="center"| 860 
|align="center"| 872husband's accession|align="center"| after 16 June 918husband's death|align="center"| -
|align="center"| Odo
|-
|align="center"|  
|align="center"| Guinidilda of Barcelona
|align="center"| Wifred II, Count of Barcelona(Barcelona)
|align="center"| -
|align="center"| -
|align="center"| after 16 June 918husband's accession|align="center"| 924husband's death|align="center"| after 28 September 926
|align="center"| Raymond II
|-
|align="center"| 
|align="center"| Garsenda of Gascony
|align="center"| García II, Duke of Gascony
|align="center"| -
|align="center"| -
|align="center"| 924husband's accession|align="center"| 950husband's death|align="center"| after 972
|align="center"| Raymond Pons
|-
|align="center"| 
|align="center"| Gundinildis
|align="center"| -
|align="center"| -
|align="center" colspan="2"| -
|align="center"| 972husband's death?|align="center"| -
|align="center" rowspan="2"| Raymond (III)orRaymond (IV)
|-
|align="center"| 
|align="center"| Adelaide of Anjou
|align="center"| Fulk II, Count of Anjou(Angevins)
|align="center"| 947
|align="center" colspan="2"| 975
|align="center"| 978husband's death|align="center"| 29 May 1026
|-
|align="center"| 
|align="center"| Arsende
|align="center"| -
|align="center"| -
|align="center"| -
|align="center"| 972/8husband's accession|align="center" colspan="2"| -
|align="center" rowspan="2"| William III Taillefer
|-
|align="center"| 
|align="center"| Emma of Provence
|align="center"| Rotbold II, Count of Provence
|align="center"| 975/80
|align="center" colspan="2"| 992 or before
|align="center"| September 1037husband's death|align="center"| 1062, or after
|-
|align="center"|  
|align="center"| Majore
|align="center"| -
|align="center"| -
|align="center"| 1022
|align="center"| September 1037husband's accession|align="center" colspan="2"| 1044 or before
|align="center" rowspan="3"| Pons
|-
|align="center"| 
|align="center"| Almodis de la Marche
|align="center"| Bernard I, Count of La Marche
|align="center"| -
|align="center" colspan="2"| 1045
|align="center"| 1053, after 29 Junerepudiated|align="center"| 5 April/16 August 1097
|-
|align="center"|
|align="center"| Sancha of Aragon
|align="center"| Ramiro I of Aragon(Jiménez)
|align="center"| -
|align="center" colspan="2"| -
|align="center"| September 1037husband's death|align="center"| 5 April/16 August 1097
|-
|align="center"|  
|align="center"| Matilda
|align="center"| -
|align="center"| -
|align="center"| before 1067
|align="center"| 1060husband's usurpation|align="center" colspan="2"| -
|align="center" rowspan="2"| William IV
|-
|align="center"|  
|align="center"| Emma de Mortain
|align="center"| Robert, Count of Mortain
|align="center"| 1058  
|align="center" colspan="2"| before 1080
|align="center" colspan="2"| after 1080
|-
|}

 Junior House of Rouergue, 1105–1271 

 House of Montfort, 1215–1224 in opposition with the House of Rouergue. House of Bourbon, 1681–1821 Passed to the House of Orléans on the death of Louise Marie Adélaïde de Bourbon and remain unused amongst the Orleanist pretenders.

MacCarthy Reagh, 1776–1906 
referred to as Countess MacCarthy of the City of Toulouse rather than Countess of Toulouse

See also
 List of Aquitainian consorts
 Countess of Tripoli
 List of consorts of Provence
 Duchess of Narbonne

Notes

Sources

 
Toulouse